Scinax eurydice is a species of frog in the family Hylidae.
It is endemic to Brazil.
Its natural habitats are subtropical or tropical moist lowland forests, subtropical or tropical moist shrubland, subtropical or tropical seasonally wet or flooded lowland grassland, swamps, freshwater lakes, intermittent freshwater lakes, freshwater marshes, intermittent freshwater marshes, heavily degraded former forest, and ponds.
It is threatened by habitat loss.

References

eurydice
Endemic fauna of Brazil
Amphibians described in 1968
Taxonomy articles created by Polbot